This is a list of Spanish television related events from 1967.

Events
 6 October: Popular TV Sitcom La casa de los Martínez debut on TVE.
 13 November: Official Inauguration of Escuela de Radio y Televisión (School of Radio and Television).

Debuts

Television shows

La 1

Ending this year

La 1

Foreign series debuts in Spain

La 1

Births

 16 January - Víctor Sandoval, host.
 19 January - Javier Cámara, actor.
 20 January - Pepón Nieto, actor.
 2 February - Noemí Galera, casting director.
 12 February - Ángeles Martín, actress and hostess.
 22 February - Jorge Bosch, actor.
 23 February -  Verónica Mengod, actress and hostess.
  21 March - María Rey,  hostess.
  2 April - Jon Sistiaga, journalist.
 22 May - Paloma Lago, hostess.
 23 June - Álex Pina, producer.
 14 July - Raquel Revuelta, hostess.
 15 August - Minerva Piquero, hostess.
 27 September - Machús Osinaga, journalist.
 29 September - Miki Nadal, comedian and host.
 8 October - Yvonne Reyes, hostess.
 14 October - Lola Marceli, actress.
 15 October - Manuel Marlasca, journalist
 4 November - Julian Iantzi, host.
 11 November - Nathalie Seseña, actress.
 12 December - Mikel López Iturriaga, host.
  28 December - Mabel Lozano, actress and hostess.
  José Manuel Guisado "Mané", actor.
  Nuria Gallardo, actress.
  Sonsoles Suárez, hostess.

See also
1967 in Spain
List of Spanish films of 1967

References 

1967 in Spanish television